Foster Pond is an unincorporated community in the historic Bluff Precinct of Monroe County, Illinois, United States. It is located along the historic road, the present Illinois Route 156 which ran from the landings on the Mississippi River at the old county seat of Harrisonville to Waterloo and beyond.

Unincorporated communities in Monroe County, Illinois
Unincorporated communities in Illinois
Metro East